Aetholopus is a genus of longhorn beetles of the subfamily Lamiinae, containing the following species:

 Aetholopus exutus Pascoe, 1865
 Aetholopus halmaheirae Breuning, 1982
 Aetholopus lumawigi Hayashi, 1976
 Aetholopus papuanus Breuning, 1948
 Aetholopus scalaris Pascoe, 1865
 Aetholopus sericeus Breuning, 1938
 Aetholopus thylactoides Breuning, 1958

References

Xylorhizini